The 1986 Thomas Cup & Uber Cup was the 14th tournament of Thomas Cup and the 11th tournament of Uber Cup, the most important badminton team competitions in the world.

China won its second title in the Thomas Cup and in the Uber Cup, both after beating Indonesia in the final round.

Thomas Cup

Teams
38 teams took part in the competition.

Final stage

Group A

Group B

Knockout stage

Final

Uber Cup

Teams
34 teams took part in the competition, and eight teams qualified for the Final Stage.

Final stage

Group A

Group B

Knockout stage

Final

References
tangkis.tripod.com

Thomas Uber Cup
Thomas Uber Cup
Thomas & Uber Cup